is a 1956 Japanese drama film directed by Mikio Naruse.

Plot
Kiyoko lives with her husband Shinji and Shinji's mother in the family's house, where the married couple runs a not-too-successful food store. Although their marriage is not happy, it is pragmatic, and both agree on the plan to open an additional coffee shop in the house, despite the mother's objections. Kiyoko asks her friend Sumiko's brother Kenkichi, a bank clerk, for a loan, which he approves. Shortly after, Shinji's older brother Zenichi loses his job. Together with his wife and mother, Zenichi puts pressure on Kiyoko and Shinji to give the money to him to start his own business. Although both Kiyoko and Shinji are against Zenichi's plan, they slowly retreat. Kiyoki feels humiliated when she is told that Shinji visited a hot spring with a friend and two geisha. At the same time, she and Kenkichi develop a mutual affection, which they never openly acknowledge. When Shinji learns that Kiyoko was seen with Kenkichi in public, he offers to let her go, but Kiyoko eventually stays with her husband, affirming that they should carry on with their project to open a café.

Cast 
 Hideko Takamine as Kiyoko
 Keiju Kobayashi as Shinji
 Toshiro Mifune as Kenkichi
 Yoko Sugi as Yumiko, Kenkichi's sister
 Eiko Miyoshi as Shinji's mother
 Minoru Chiaki as Zenichi, Shinji's brother
 Chieko Nakakita as Kaoru, Zenichi's wife
 Akemi Negishi as Sumiko, Shinji's sister
 Haruo Tanaka as Kunio
 Ranko Hanai as Kunio's wife and madame
 Machiko Kitagawa as geisha
 Toki Shiozawa as geisha
 Sadako Sawamura as Namiko
 Daisuke Katō as chef
 Yoshio Tsuchiya

References

External links
 
 

1956 films
1956 drama films
1950s Japanese-language films
Japanese black-and-white films
Films directed by Mikio Naruse
Toho films
Films produced by Sanezumi Fujimoto
Films scored by Ichirō Saitō
Japanese drama films